Donald Ferguson may refer to:
Donald Ferguson (politician) (1839–1909), Canadian politician
Donald Ferguson (cyclist) (born 1931), American cyclist
Donald F. Ferguson (born 1960), Dell executive

See also
Don Ferguson (disambiguation)
Ferguson (name)